Lake Pelagatos is a lake in Peru.

See also
 Challhuacocha
List of lakes in Peru

References
INEI, Compendio Estadistica 2007, page 26

Lakes of Peru
Lakes of Ancash Region